Noémi Boekel (born March 8, 1984 in Huizen) is a Dutch softball player, who represents the Dutch national team in international competitions.

Boekel played for Zuidvogels, Instant Holland A90, Amsterdam Pirates and since 2005 for Sparks Haarlem. She is a catcher and third baseman who bats and throws right-handed. She competes for the Dutch national team since 2004. In 2007 she won the Egbert van der Sluis Memorial for being the best Dutch under-23 international player. She is part of the Dutch team for the 2008 Summer Olympics in Beijing.

External links
 Boekel at dutchsoftballteam.com

References

1984 births
Living people
People from Huizen
Dutch softball players
Olympic softball players of the Netherlands
Softball players at the 2008 Summer Olympics
Sportspeople from North Holland